George Consider Hale (1850-1923) was fire chief in Kansas City, Missouri from 1882 to 1902. During this time he competed in the international firemen competition in Paris, and another in London in 1893. He was also the holder of more than 60 patents for fire fighting equipment. He is an honoree of Kansas City Fire Brigade's Hall of Fame.

Biography
He was born in 1850. He was fire chief in Kansas City, Missouri from 1882 to 1902. He was president of the International Association of Fire Chiefs in 1889.

He died in 1923.

Writings
History of the world's greatest fires (1905)
Compound rotary engine] (1911)

References

1850 births
1923 deaths
American fire chiefs
People from Kansas City, Missouri
International Association of Fire Chiefs